Unlimited Edition is a compilation album by the band Can.  Released in 1976 as a double album, it was an expanded version of the 1974 LP Limited Edition on United Artists Records which, as the name suggests, was a limited release of 15,000 copies (tracks 14–19 were added).   The album collects unreleased music from throughout the band's history from 1968 until 1976, and both the band's major singers (Damo Suzuki and Malcolm Mooney) are featured. The cover photos were taken among the Elgin Marbles in the Duveen Gallery of the British Museum.

Track notes
The abbreviation "E.F.S.", appearing in several of the track titles, refers to Ethnological Forgery Series, a series of songs in which Can self-consciously imitated various "world music" genres.  "Mother Upduff" is a retelling of an urban legend involving a family whose grandmother dies while they are on holiday together, and whose corpse – left wrapped up on the roof of the family car – is later stolen along with the car. Recording of tracks "I'm Too Leise" and "LH 702 (Nairobi/München)" is seen in the film "Can Free Concert 1972" by Peter Przygodda.

Track listing
Note: Tracks 14–19 were only on Unlimited Edition.

Personnel
Holger Czukay – bass guitar, tape effects
Michael Karoli – guitar, violin, shehnai on track 3
Jaki Liebezeit – drums, percussion, winds on tracks 4, 9, 11, 14, 16
Irmin Schmidt – keyboards, synthesizer, schizophone on track 10, voice on tracks 8 and 14
Damo Suzuki – vocals on tracks 2, 4, 6, 7, 8
Malcolm Mooney – vocals on tracks 10, 12, 14, 15, 16

Production credits
 Composed, written and produced by Can
 Recording by Holger Czukay and René Tinner at CAN Studio, Weilerswist, Germany
 Frontcover – Trevor Key

References

External links
 'Unlimited Edition' at the ProgArchives.com. Accessed 30 April 2008.

1976 compilation albums
Can (band) albums
Harvest Records compilation albums
Elgin Marbles